Katha Ithuvare is a 1985 Indian Malayalam film,  directed by Joshiy and produced by Joy Thomas. The film stars Madhu, Mammootty, Rahman, Thilakan, Suhasini and Rohini in the lead roles. The film has musical score by Johnson.

Cast
Madhu
Mammootty As Balan
Rahman
Suhasini As Rekha
Rohini
Thilakan
Baby Shalini
Chithra As Susy
Innocent
Lalu Alex
Kunjan
Anandavally

Soundtrack
The music was composed by Johnson and the lyrics were written by Poovachal Khader.

References

External links
 

1985 films
1980s Malayalam-language films
Films directed by Joshiy